Nebojša "Uške" Vučićević (29 June 1962 – 11 March 2022) was a Serbian football manager and player.

Club career
Vučićević started out at OFK Beograd, before transferring to Partizan in 1984. He spent the following five seasons with the Crno-beli, making 140 league appearances and scoring 26 goals. Subsequently, Vučićević moved abroad and played for Metz and Salamanca. He also played professionally in South Korea, Cyprus and Slovenia. In 1998, Vučićević briefly played indoor soccer in the United States.

After ending his playing career, Vučićević returned to his homeland and started his managerial career working at lower league clubs. He later managed several top tier clubs such as Obilić and Hajduk Kula but also worked abroad in Slovenia, Ghana, and Ethiopia.

Personal life
Vučićević died on 11 March 2022, at the age of 59. His son, Vanja, is also a footballer.

Honours
Partizan
 Yugoslav First League: 1985–86, 1986–87
 Yugoslav Cup: 1988–89

References

External links
 PrvaLiga profile
 
 
 

1962 births
2022 deaths
Accra Hearts of Oak S.C. managers
Association football midfielders
Busan IPark players
Cypriot First Division players
Evagoras Paphos players
Expatriate football managers in Bosnia and Herzegovina
Expatriate football managers in Ethiopia
Expatriate football managers in Ghana
Expatriate football managers in Slovenia
Expatriate footballers in Cyprus
Expatriate footballers in France
Expatriate footballers in Slovenia
Expatriate footballers in South Korea
Expatriate footballers in Spain
Expatriate soccer players in the United States
FC Metz players
FK Hajduk Kula managers
FK Novi Pazar managers
FK Obilić managers
FK Partizan players
FK Smederevo managers
FK Timok managers
K League 1 players
Kansas City Attack players
Ligue 1 players
National Professional Soccer League (1984–2001) players
NK Korotan Prevalje players
NK Mura players
NK Železničar Maribor players
OFK Beograd players
Segunda División players
Serbia and Montenegro expatriate footballers
Serbia and Montenegro expatriate sportspeople in Bosnia and Herzegovina
Serbia and Montenegro expatriate sportspeople in Cyprus
Serbia and Montenegro expatriate sportspeople in Slovenia
Serbia and Montenegro expatriate sportspeople in South Korea
Serbia and Montenegro expatriate sportspeople in the United States
Serbia and Montenegro footballers
Serbian expatriate football managers
Serbian expatriate sportspeople in Slovenia
Serbian football managers
Serbian footballers
Serbian SuperLiga managers
Slovenian PrvaLiga players
Footballers from Belgrade
UD Salamanca players
Yugoslav expatriate footballers
Yugoslav expatriates in France
Yugoslav expatriates in Spain
Yugoslav First League players
Yugoslav footballers
FK Jedinstvo Brčko managers
Serbian expatriate sportspeople in Ghana
Serbian expatriate sportspeople in Ethiopia
Ghana Premier League managers
Ethiopian Premier League managers